Anastasiya Mikhalenka (born November 8, 1995) is a Belarusian weightlifter, competing in the 69 kg category and representing Belarus at international competitions. Mikhalenka participated in the women's 48 kg event at the 2014 World Weightlifting Championships, and at the 2016 Summer Olympics, where she failed to register a single lift in all three attempts of the snatch phase.

Major results

References

1995 births
Living people
Belarusian female weightlifters
Place of birth missing (living people)
Olympic weightlifters of Belarus
Weightlifters at the 2016 Summer Olympics